Ivan Erazem Tatenbah is a novel by Slovenian author Josip Jurčič. It was first published in 1873.

See also
List of Slovenian novels

Slovenian novels
1873 novels